Bangaradantha Maga (Kannada: ಬಂಗಾರದಂಥ ಮಗ) is a 1991 Indian Kannada film, directed by Y. R. Swamy and produced by R. Rama Raju. The film stars Balaraj, Geetha Raju, Shivakumar, and Keerthi in the lead roles. The film has musical score by S. Vasu Rao.

Cast

Balaraj
Geetha Raju
Shivakumar
Keerthi
Kalyan Kumar
Hema Choudhary
Dinesh
Aravind
Rajanand
Umashree
Kadambari
Shubha
Reshma
Sathyabhama
Master Amith
Master Raghavendra
Master Rajendra Prasad
Baby Roopa

References

External links
 

1991 films
1990s Kannada-language films
Films directed by Y. R. Swamy